KHWI (92.1 FM), is a radio station in Holualoa, Hawaii broadcasting an Adult Top 40 format. Prior to October 2012, the station simulcasted co-owned KIPA and KHBC. The station is currently owned by Resonate Hawaii, LLC., a division of Australia-based Resonate Broadcasting.

References

External links

HWI
Radio stations established in 2007
2007 establishments in Hawaii
Hot adult contemporary radio stations in the United States
Adult top 40 radio stations in the United States
Resonate Broadcasting